The 2021–22 Milwaukee Panthers men's basketball team represented the University of Wisconsin–Milwaukee during the 2021–22 NCAA Division I men's basketball season. The Panthers, led by fifth-year head coach Pat Baldwin, played their home games at the UW–Milwaukee Panther Arena as members of the Horizon League. They finished the season 10–21, 8–14 in Horizon League play to finish in ninth place. They lost in the first round of the Horizon League Tournament to UIC.

On March 2, 2022, the school fired head coach Pat Baldwin. On March 19, the school named Division II Queens University head coach Bart Lundy the team's new head coach.

Previous season
In a season limited due to the ongoing COVID-19 pandemic, the Panthers finished the 2020–21 season 10–12, 7–10 in Horizon League play to finish in eighth place. They lost in the semifinals of the Horizon League tournament to Cleveland State.

Offseason

Departures

2021 recruiting class

Preseason
The Panthers were picked to finish in fourth place in the Horizon League in the coaches' poll, receiving two first-place votes and a total of 396 points. Patrick Baldwin Jr. was selected to the Preseason First Team All-Horizon League, while DeAndre Gholston was selected to the Preseason Second Team All-Horizon League.

Roster

Schedule and results 

|-
!colspan=9 style=| Exhibition

|-
!colspan=9 style=| Regular season

|-
!colspan=12 style=| Horizon League tournament

Source

References

Milwaukee Panthers men's basketball seasons
Milwaukee
Milwaukee
Milwaukee